Abigail Lawrie (born 1997) is a Scottish actress. She won a Scottish BAFTA for her performance in the Sky Atlantic crime drama Tin Star (2017–2020). Lawrie made her screen debut in the BBC miniseries The Casual Vacancy (2015).

Early life and work
Lawrie was born and raised in Aberdeen, where she attended a local drama club as a child. At the age of 14 she moved with her family to London, where she attended The Harrodian School and became involved with its drama department. With this she performed in plays including a two-week stint at the Edinburgh Festival.

Career
In 2014, Lawrie was cast as Krystal Weedon, a troubled teenager, in the three-part BBC adaptation of The Casual Vacancy. In the same year Lawrie also appeared on stage in London at the Orange Tree Theatre, where she performed in When We Were Women. In 2017 she portrayed Sophie Lancaster in the TV movie Murdered for Being Different, which is based on the murder of Sophie Lancaster. Lawrie starred in three series of Tin Star in which she played Anna, a member of the Worth family, who are running from their dark past. In 2019, Lawrie played Finnoula in Our Ladies based on the Alan Warner novel The Sopranos.

Filmography

Film

Television

Stage
2015: When We Were Women (Orange Tree Theatre)
2017: This Beautiful Future (The Yard Theatre)

Awards and nominations

References

External links
 

Living people
1997 births
21st-century British actresses
Actresses from Aberdeen
British film actresses
British television actresses
People educated at The Harrodian School